The men's 1500 metres race of the 2015–16 ISU Speed Skating World Cup 4, arranged in the Thialf arena in Heerenveen, Netherlands, was held on 13 December 2015.

Joey Mantia of the United States won the race, while Denis Yuskov of Russia came second, and Kjeld Nuis of the Netherlands came third. Jeffrey Swider-Peltz of the United States won the Division B race.

Results
The race took place on Sunday, 13 December, with Division B scheduled in the morning session, at 10:45, and Division A scheduled in the afternoon session, at 14:54.

Division A

Division B

References

Men 1500
4